The gracile naked-tailed shrew (Crocidura maurisca) is a species of mammal in the family Soricidae. It is found in Burundi, Gabon, Kenya, and Uganda. Its natural habitat is swamps.

References

Crocidura
Mammals described in 1904
Taxa named by Oldfield Thomas
Taxonomy articles created by Polbot